This is a list of the squads for the 2022 CONCACAF Women's U-20 Championship in Dominican Republic between February 25 and March 12, 2022. The 20 national teams involved in the tournament were required to register a squad of 20 players each, two of whom must be goalkeepers; only players in these squads were eligible to take part in the tournament. Players born on or after 1 January 2002 are eligible to compete.

Players marked (c) were named as captain for their national squad.

Group E

Dominican Republic 
Coach:  José Benito Rubido

Nicaragua 
Coach:  Elna Dixon

Puerto Rico 
Coach:  Nat González

United States 
Coach:  Tracey Kevins

Group F

Guyana 
Coach: Paul DeAbreu

Honduras 
Coach:  Juan Carlos Tenorio

Mexico 
Coach:  Maribel Domínguez

Panama 
Coach:  Raiza Gutiérrez

Group G

Canada 
Coach:  Cindy Tye

El Salvador 
Coach:  Eric Acuña

Saint Kitts and Nevis 
Coach:  Earl Jones

Trinidad and Tobago 
Coach:  Jason Spence

Group H

Cuba 
Coach:  Midel Logal Domínguez

Guatemala 
Coach:  Edy Espinoza

Haiti 
Coach:  Fiorda Charles

Jamaica 
Coach:  Xavier Gilbert

References

External links
 2022 CWU20C final rosters announced
 National team rosters

squads